Sep Ruf (full name Franz Joseph Ruf; 9 March 1908, in Munich – 29 July 1982, in Munich) was a German architect and designer strongly associated with the Bauhaus group. He was one of the representatives of modern architecture in Germany after World War II. His elegant buildings received high credits in Germany and Europe and his German pavilion of the Expo 58 in Brussels, built together with Egon Eiermann, achieved worldwide recognition. He attended the Interbau 1957 in Berlin-Hansaviertel and was one of the three architects who had the top secret order to create the governmental buildings in the new capital city of the Federal Republic of Germany, Bonn. His best known building was the residence for the Federal Chancellor of the Federal Republic of Germany, built for Ludwig Erhard, the so-called Chancellor's Bungalow.

Personal life 

His father was Josef Ruf and his mother was Wilhelmine Mina Ruf (née Scharrer). The family of his father came from Dinkelsbühl and his mother's family lived in Weißenburg in Bayern, both in middle Franconia. He had a brother Franz Ruf born 1909. His first years at school he spent in a primary school in Munich. He was a Roman Catholic and went to the boy scouts, where he met friends, he had for his lifetime: Golo Mann, the son of the famous German writer and Nobel laureate in literature Thomas Mann and the later physicist and Nobel Prize laureate Werner Heisenberg. Until his years of study he went to the Luitpold-Oberrealschule and he loved skiing and climbing in the mountains.
During this time he met his later fiancée, Aloisia Ruf, née Mayer, born in Munich, 2 April 1910, a daughter of a factory owner. They married 1938, built a home in Gmund am Tegernsee and had two children. His bureau was in Munich. Ruf loved to travel and he visited Austria, Italy, Greece, France, Belgium, Switzerland, the United States and Norway. 1969 he bought a winery in Italy and renovated the house. He became friend with many artists like Marino Marini and Bruno Pulga and had guests in Italy such as Henry Moore. He also kept in touch with Walter Gropius, Ludwig Mies van der Rohe, Richard Neutra and Romano Guardini. He is called to be the German architect, who realized the ideas of the Bauhaus most consequent.
In 1982 he died in Munich and was buried at the mountain cemetery of Gmund am Tegernsee.

Early career 

He studied architecture and city planning at the Technical University Munich from 1926 until 1931. Then he opened his own bureau. One year later his brother spent a year in his bureau before he opened his own. Ruf began to build houses for doctors, actors and manufacturers and they loved his light and bright buildings. In 1933, when he was 23 years old, he built a flat-roof house for Karl Schwend in Munich and was cautioned from the new authorities, because from 1933 on the building of a flat-roof house was forbidden. He continued building houses and now he had to build them with pitched roofs, but the interior did not change and was still bright and had wide rooms and large windows. From 1936-1938 he was ordered to build parts of the Werdenfels and the Kemmel barracks in Murnau, after the war they were used by the US army and German troops. As soon as possible he went back to the building of private houses. In 1939 Ruf had to go to war. From 1940 to 1942 he was allowed to stay at home because he worked as an independent architect with the family of Hugo Junkers. From 1934 to 1936, one year before his death, Junkers had allowed the 26-year-old architect to build an estate for his workers in Grünwald, Bavaria. Hugo Junkers, who had lost nearly all of his inventions and his factory in Dessau to the new authorities and now lived near Munich under surveillance, now did research for metal-housing. In 1942 Ruf had to go to the Russian front and after the war had ended, he went back to Germany by foot and directly began his work of rebuilding Germany with the Church Christkönig in Munich.

First modern buildings 

One of his first works were buildings for the HICOG (High Commissioner of Germany), the Allied High Commission at the palace Deichmannsaue in Bad-Godesberg/Bonn together with the architects Otto Apel, Rudolf Letocha, Rohrer and Herdt. The tower-building of the HICOG went to be the Embassy of the United States in Bonn from 1955 until 1999.  After the Embassy moved to Berlin the two parts became two ministries. They also built the residential estates of Plittersdorf, Tannenbusch and Muffendorf, where the German and American staff lived. Every estate had about 400 houses, wide streets and an apartment tower in the middle. Ruf made the development plan.

From 1949 till 1951 he built the Bayerische Staatsbank in Nuremberg an atrium-building with a large glass-ceiling.

Professorship and teaching 

In 1947 Ruf became a professor at the Academy of Fine Arts, Nuremberg. The original building was destroyed, so the first academy was in the residence of Ellingen. Ruf later built the new pavilions for the Academy of Fine Arts at Bingstreet. In 1953 he went to the Academy of Fine Arts, Munich and was the president from 1958 to 1961. In 1971 he was pronounced as an honorary member. He was one of the founders of the Academy of Fine Arts, Berlin (west), Akademie der Künste, he was a member of the academy from 1955 until 1982.

Academy of Fine Arts Nuremberg 

During 1952-1954 he built the Academy of Fine Arts, Nuremberg. The pavilions were connected with open, roofed passageways all in white in a green park with old trees. The flat-roofed light seeming building is the only campus in the world, made in this way. The only high building is the auditorium, on both sides open with glass-walls. The way to build these pavilions was later used again for the pavilions of the Expo 58 in Brussels. The studios and ateliers are looking to the atrium, so the students can work inside as well as outside in the green patio. It was the first building in southern Germany that became heritage-protected.

New Maxburg Munich 

One of his most elegant buildings was the New Maxburg in Munich. William V., Duke of Bavaria, built the residence from 1593 to 1596. In the 17th century it was called the Herzog-Max-Burg. After it was destroyed in World War II., only the renaissance-tower was still standing. The city asked some architects to find ideas for the place and allowed to destroy the old tower. Only Ruf and Theo Papst were the two architects, who wanted to save it. So both got the order to build the New Maxburg. The steel skeleton building followed the structure of the tower and in the middle of the buildings is a green meadow and a fountain. The building of Justice is one of the most elegant buildings in Europe, like Nikolaus Pevsner wrote. Especially the Atrium with the glass-ceiling and the curved stair is impressing.

World fair Brussels 1958 

The sign of the Expo 58 in Brussels was the Atomium. 41.454.412 people visited the exhibition. Ruf and Egon Eiermann made plans for the German pavilion and it was decided they should work together. They decided to build eight glass-pavilions that were connected with open pathways, like Ruf had designed for the Academy of Fine Arts, Nuremberg. They were placed within a garden of 6000 m² and in the middle was a little pond. The garden was designed by the landscape architect Walter Rossow from the Deutscher Werkbund. There was a 57 m long steel-bridge with a 50 m high pylon. The newspapers of the world gave the best critics. The Times, London, wrote: "It is the most elegant pavilion of the exhibition".

Chancellor's Bungalow Bonn 

In 1962 Ruf, Egon Eiermann and Paul Baumgarten got the top secret order to design and build the government buildings of the new capital city of the western part of Germany, Bonn. Every architect got his own part to realize. For example, the new upper house of the German parliament, the tower building of the delegates, the private- and representative house of the chancellor of the Federal Republic.

In 1963 and 1964 Ruf built the house for the chancellor. It was to be a house to live in and also to be a representative building to welcome guests of state. In a park beside the river Rhine he built a flat-roofed house with large glass-windows, that should show the open democratic way, the new Germany was thinking. The bungalow is designed with two quadrates with two atriums and one part of the house is wide open to the park and the other private part into one atrium with a small swimming pool. When Ludwig Erhard got the keys he said: "You can understand me better, when you look at this house, as if you would listen to a political speech of mine".
Ludwig Erhard and Helmut Schmidt liked and used the modern building, whereas Willy Brandt, who had young children, used it for state visitors, preferring to remain in his private residence. Helmut Kohl lived there nearly 16 years, until Berlin became the new capital city. Today it is a museum and can be visited. The Chancellor's Bungalow may be the world's most open, public official residence.

Ruf realized a lot of buildings in Bonn, for example the Federal Ministry of Food, Agriculture and Consumer Protection and the addition to Haus Carstanjen, the former  Federal Ministry of Finance (Germany), today the UNFCCC of the United Nations Framework Convention on Climate Change, is part of the UN-Campus. 2014 the Chancellor's Bungalow was the central part of the German contribution at the 14th International Architecture Exhibition in Venice. It was built 1:1 into the German pavilion.

Further modern buildings 

Ruf made development plans for the cities, of Nuremberg, Munich, Fulda and Bonn.

1960-1966 he built the tower building of the BHF Bank, with 82 m and 23 stories, 1966 it was the highest tower building of the financial metropolis.

In 1852 Hans von und zu Aufseß had the idea to realize a museum for a "well-ordered compendium of all available source material for German history, literature and art". Parts of the former Nuremberg Charterhouse, dissolved in 1525, were used for the museum.  During World War II. great parts of the museum were destroyed. So Ruf and Harald Roth made the development plans. They began to rebuild the museum from 1953 until 1978 and Ruf designed several modern exhibition areas. The first was the Theodor Heuss -Bau. The first Federal President Theodor Heuss came to the opening and said, he was happy to see, that there was conceived something new, than to try to imitate the old.

St. Johann von Capistran is a round Church and it is called to be the last cathedral in Munich. Ruf built it 1958–60. The building is designed with two crescent-shaped shells, in the inside there are the sacred rooms. The flat roof is lying upon a circlet of glass and has a glass-dome. Outside 22 pillars hold the roof free above the open room.

The Bavarian State Library is one of Europe's most important universal libraries. With its collections currently comprising around 9.81 million books. The legal deposit law has been in force since 1663, regulating that two copies of every printed work published in Bavaria have to be submitted to the Bayerische Staatsbibliothek. This law is still applicable today. The Bayerische Staatsbibliothek furthermore is Europe's second-largest journals library (after the British Library). Parts of the Library were destroyed in World War II.

1953-1966 the professors Hans Döllgast and Ruf had to plan and realized the reconstruction of the eastern wing, a new area behind historic walls, and the extension building of the Bavarian State Library, a glass-steel frame construction for the bibliotheca. They made an available surface of 17,000 m2 and a volume of 84,000 m3. In 1967 a jury with Hans Scharoun gave the price of the BDA Bayern to the extension building.

1956–1957 he built the royal picture palace am Goetheplatz in Munich, in those days one of the two picture palaces in Europe, playing Todd-AO, and Michael Todd came to the opening and they showed the German first broadcast of the musical Oklahoma!.

In Berlin he was part of the historic International Building Exhibition, the Interbau 1957 in Berlin. On the area of the Hansaviertel 53 architects from 13 countries made 35 drafts, that were realized by Alvar Aalto, Paul Baumgarten, Egon Eiermann, Walter Gropius, Arne Jacobsen, Oscar Niemeyer, Max Taut, Pierre Vargo and Ruf and others.  1160 living quarters, tower buildings and flat roofed houses, churches, cinema, library, kindergarten and a subway station. Walter Rossow, a landscape gardener from Berlin planned with a team the green areas. Three buildings of the exhibition were built by Le Corbusier, Hugh Stubbins (US) and Bruno Grimmek. Some of the artists were Henry Moore, Fritz Winter and  Bernhard Heiliger. Ruf built two flat roofed houses.

Further buildings were the Max Planck Institute for Physics with the Werner Heisenberg -institute for Physics, in Munich-Freimann and the German University of Administrative Sciences Speyer.

The baroque town of Fulda called him to be part of the committee of art of the city. He designed the frontage of the storage- building of Karstadt and built the Patronatsbau, he also designed the Universitäts- and Borgiaplatz. His aim was to make an elegant inclusion of a modern building into the baroque surrounding. He also built the modern Church for the catholic seminary students in Fulda.

There he built the technical centre and some administration buildings of the HypoVereinsbank at the Eisbach, from 1964 until 1974 the buildings for IBM and the Hilton Park Hotel. At Lake Tegernsee he designed the museum for the painter and graphic artist Olaf Gulbransson. 1978–1982 another building for a museum was his hall for aviation- and space flight for the Deutsches Museum Munich.

Furniture 

Beneath his architectural works he designed a large schedule of furniture. He designed for every house he built and he made different works, belonging to the house and to the inhabitants. He used every material and worked with wood, glass and chrome.
He made steel-tube furniture as well as lamps with basketwork.

His wooden furniture also begins as natural country style, with a modern and very simple way, as well as his representative tables for bureaus and living with chrome, wood and glass. His design is classic and timeless.

He designed for living, official areas and churches, even the sacred parts.

Mostly known he got with the furniture of the living- and representative house, the so-called chancellor's bungalow for Chancellor Ludwig Erhard in Bonn.

Studies 

The oeuvre of Ruf lead onto several academic studies and presentations about his buildings and his life and work in Germany, Switzerland, Italy and the US.

List of works (selection) 

 1931: house of the fabricant of sweets Wilhelm Suwelack in Billerbeck
 1931–1933: flat roof construction, house for Dr. Karl Schwend in Munich, because of the flat roof he was cautioned by the new authorities.
 1932: house for Dr. med. Sepp Ruf in Ahlen, same name, not related
 1932: house for the lawyer Willy Rosenbusch in Ingolstadt
 1933: atelier-house for the painter Max Rauh in Munich, 1937 one of his pictures was part of the Degenerate Art Exhibition.
 1933: house for Dr. med. Alfred Schönwerth in Grafrath
 1933–1934: together with his brother Franz Ruf part of the residential estate in Ramersdorf, they built 16 of 192 houses
 1934–1937: house for a friend Alois Johannes Lippl, director, author, on 25 January 1948 the US military government in Munich gave him the license to start the Bavarian radio, Bayerischer Rundfunk
 1934: house Dr. Ernst Haß, Munich -Harlaching
 1934–1936: residential estate Herrenwies for Hugo Junkers (today called: Hugo-Junkers-estate) in Grünwald, Bavaria
 1935: house Brand, Munich-Bogenhausen
 1935: house Karl and Maria Eder, Munich-Laim
 1936: house of the poet Josef Martin Bauer in Dorfen
 1936: house for the director Otto Falckenberg in Grünwald, Bavaria near by Munich, he founded the Otto Falckenberg School of the Performing Arts
 1936–1940: primary school in Munich-Allach, today a secondary modern school
 1936–1938: barracks for German mountain troops „Kemmel-Kaserne“ in Murnau am Staffelsee, 1946 - 1990 used by the US army.
 1937-1938 house for himself in Gmund am Tegernsee, marriage 1938
 1938: Oberland-residential-estate together with his brother Franz Ruf an der Einhornallee in Munich
 1938–1939: barracks for German mountain troops Murnau am Staffelsee, Weilheimer Straße, Werdenfels-barracks, today used by the German troops.
 1939: extension building for the primary school Allach, in München-Allach, planned 1936, while it was built the new authorities changed some rules and it was ended as a "Hochlandheim". Today it is part of the secondary modern school.
 1945: house for the owner of a brick factory, Mr. Meindl, St. Wolfgang, Hofgut Reit
 1946: house of Mr. Holzner in Dorfen
 1946–1947 house of Siegfried Vetter in Feldkirchen bei München
 1947–1948: house of Pius Egner in Notzing
 1947–1950: Christkönig-church in Munich-Nymphenburg (rebuilding)
 1947–1948: house of Fritz Espermüller, Kaufbeuren
 1948: residential-estate Hausnergasse, Ellingen, Hausnergasse 13, 15, 17, 19, 21, commendation of the Bavarian Minister-President Hans Ehard
 1950–1951: Bayerische Staatsbank in Nuremberg
 1950–1952: First apartment tower in Munich, Theresienstraße 46-48
 1951: American Embassy in Bonn-Bad Godesberg
 1952–1954: Academy of Fine Arts, Nuremberg.
 1952–1955: Bungalows in Gmund am Tegernsee, three flat-roof buildings, one for the later chancellor Ludwig Erhard and for himself.
 1952–1957: New Maxburg in Munich
 1953–1969: Building of the Deutschen Forschungsgemeinschaft, Bonn-Bad-Godesberg
 1953–1954: residential- estate Hirschelgasse 36-42 in Nuremberg
 1953–1954: Katholic church To the twelve apostles in Munich-Laim
 1953–1978: Germanisches Nationalmuseum Nürnberg: re- and newbuilding, Theodor-Heuss-Bau, Bibliotheksbau
 1954–1956: archiepiscopal ordinariate, Munich
 1956–1957: „Interbau 57“, Berlin-Hansaviertel, two houses
 1956: Bavarian representation in Bonn
 1956–1957: Royal picture palace am Goetheplatz in Munich, in those days one of the two picture palaces in Europe, playing Todd-AO
 1957–1959: Consulate General of the United States, Munich
 1957–1960: Max Planck Institute for Physics, with the Werner-Heisenberg-Institut in Munich-Freimann ( especially built for Werner Heisenberg)
 1957–1960: Church St. Johann von Capistran, in Munich-Bogenhausen, a round church
 1958: German University of Administrative Sciences Speyer in Speyer
 1958: German Pavilions for the Expo 58 in Brussels
 1960–1963: house for Nicolas Hayek at Hallwilersee, Switzerland
 1961: department store Bilka am Friedrichsplatz in Kassel
 1963–1966: department store Karstadt, Fulda, urban conception construction of the frontage, new-building of the university-place, part of the "Denkmaltopographie Fulda“,
 1963–1965: Patronatsbau, Fulda, with the conception of the Borgia-place and the fountain of Bonifatius, part of the "Denkmaltopographie Fulda“
 1963–1966: house and residence of the Chancellors of the Federal Republic of Germany, Chancellor's Bungalow in Bonn
 1964–1966: Olaf-Gulbransson-Museum for the painter and graphic artist Olaf Gulbransson in Tegernsee
 1966–1970: extension building for the Federal Ministry for the Treasury (Federal Ministry of Finance (Germany)) Haus Carstanjen, Bonn-Bad Godesberg, Ruf and Manfred Adams
 1966: extension building/eastern part of the Bavarian State Library in Munich, work of the professors Hans Döllgast and Ruf (1953-1966) and Georg Werner (1953-1960), later Hellmut Kirsten (1957-1966), BDA-Price of Bavaria (association of German architects)
 1966–1968: chapel for the catholic seminary students in Fulda
 1968: office tower-building for the Federal Ministry of Defence (Germany), Bonn
 1968–1970: Technical Centre of the HypoVereinsbank "Am Tivoli", Tucherpark in Munich
 1968–1972: IBM in Munich
 1970: BHF Bank tower-building in Frankfurt-on-Main, when it was built, it was the highest tower-building in Frankfurt
 1970–1972: Hilton Park Hotel in Munich
 1972–1977: Antico Podere Gagliole, vineyard estate for the publisher Rolf Becker, Toskana
 1973–1974: house Mr. Dohrn, Bad Homburg v.d. Höhe
 1974: renovation and expansion of Hermersberg Palace for the businessman Reinhold Würth, Niedernhall, Hermersberg
 1978–1979, 1980: administration building for the DATEV, Nuremberg
 1978–1982: Hall for aviation- and space flight for the Deutschen Museums Munich

Exhibitions 
 In memoriam Sep Ruf, 1985/86, Ausstellungen: Neue Sammlung, Munich, Akademie der Bildenden Künste, Berlin and Bayerische Vereinsbank, Nuremberg.
  Sep Ruf 1908–1982 – Sep Ruf 1908-1982 Modernism with Tradition im Architekturmuseum der Technischen Universität München in der Pinakothek der Moderne, München (31. Juli bis 5. Oktober 2008)
 Sep Ruf 1908–1982. 	Sep Ruf 1908-1982 Modernism with Tradition./ 1. Oktober 2009 – 22. November 2009 / Architekturgalerie am Weißenhof | Stuttgart Die Architekturgalerie am Weißenhof zeigt Teile der Ausstellung des Architekturmuseum der Technischen Universität München.
 Sep Ruf - Planungen und Bauten für Bonn in den 50er und 60er Jahren, GKG-Gesellschaft für Kunst und Gestaltung Bonn
 Sep Ruf 1908–1982 | Sep Ruf 1908-1982 Modernism with Tradition, ergänzt um: Wie die Quadrate auf den Uniplatz kamen ... – Sep Ruf in Fulda im Vonderau Museum | Fulda (15. Juni – 25. September 2011)
 The Architect - History and Present of a Profession, 27.09.2012 - 03.02.2013 Pinakothek der Moderne
 100 años de arquitectura y diseño en Alemania, Deutscher Werkbund 1907 – 2007, Museo Nacionale de Artes Decorativas, Madrid 22.05.2012 - 29.09.2012; Further exhibitions 2012 and 2013 in Spain: Las Naves, Valencia; Museo de Bellas Artes | Coruna, Spain.
 Der Kanzlerbungalow Photography by Igmar Kurth, Vernissage Friday 23.4.2010 06.00 p.m., Fondation Gutzwiller, Räffelstraße 24/7, 8045 Zürich, 24.4.-30.4.2010 Switzerland
 Architecture in the Realm of the Arts – 200 Years of the Academy of Fine Arts Munich 15.02.2008 - 18.05.2008 Architekturmuseum der TU München in der Pinakothek der Moderne
 100 Years German Werkbund 1907|2007, 19.04.2007 - 26.08.2007, Architekturmuseum der Technischen Universität München in der Pinakothek der Moderne; Further Exhibitions i 100 Years German Werkbund: Architekturmuseums in der Akademie der Künste, Hanseatenweg, Berlin; Muzeum Architektury | Architekturmuseum Breslau; Cagdas Sanatlar Galerisi | Ankara; Mimar Sinan Güzel Sanatlar Üniversitesi | Istanbul; Macedonian Museum of Modern Art | Thessaloniki; Benaki Museum | Athens.
 Architektur der Wunderkinder, Ausstellung in Berlin, 09.12.2005 - 11.02.2006, Im Schinkelzentrum, Technische Universität Berlin, Fakultätsforum im Architekturgebäude am Ernst-Reuter-Platz
 Architektur der Wunderkinder: Aufbruch und Verdrängung in Bayern 1945 bis 1960, 03.02.2005 - 30.04.2005, Architekturmuseum der Technischen Universität München in der Pinakothek der Moderne
 Begreifbare Baukunst - Die Bedeutung von Türgriffen in der Architektur Museum August Kestner 30159 Hannover Trammplatz 3 Laufzeit: 13. Oktober 2011 bis 08. Januar 2012 Türgriffe und -knäufe u.a. von Walter Gropius, Le Corbusier und Sep Ruf
 "Begreifbare Baukunst - Die Bedeutung von Türgriffen in der Architektur"  Termin: 29.11.2012 - 13.01.2013, Türgriffe und -knäufe u.a. von Karl Friedrich Schinkel, Josef Maria Olbrich, Walter Gropius, Sep Ruf und Le Corbusier, zudem Modelle u.a. prägender und lehrender Professoren der TU Dortmund. Dortmunder U - Zentrum für Kunst und Kreativität Leonie-Reygers-Terrasse, 44137 Dortmund
 Begreifbare Baukunst zur Bedeutung von Türgriffen in der Architektur, vom 20.November 2009 bis 13.Dezember 2009 im Roten Salon der Bauakademie, Schinkelplatz 1, Berlin
 Artur Pfau - Fotograf und Zeitzeuge Mannheims Reiss-Engelhorn-Museen. Museum Weltkulturen D5 68159 Mannheim Termin: 03.06.2012 - 29.07.2012 - Verlängert bis 27.01.2013
 Baukunst aus Raum und Licht - Sakrale Räume in der Architektur der Moderne, Museum Moderner Kunst - Wörlen Bräugasse 17 94032 Passau Termin: 24.03.2012 - 10.06.2012
 Nürnberg baut auf!  Straßen. Plätze. Bauten Stadtmuseum Fembohaus Burgstraße 15 90403 Nürnberg Ausstellung vom 29.1.-20.6.2010
 60 Jahre "Wie wohnen?" und 10 Jahre Markanto. Place of the exhibition: Markanto Depot, Mainzer Strasse 26, 50678 Köln Öffnungszeiten: September 2009, jeden Samstag von 11.00 bis 16.00 Uhr Based on zhe exhibition "Wie wohnen?" from 1949 in Stuttgart and 1950 in Karlsruhe, where examples of furnishing, constructional engineering and furniture of Egon Eiermann, Eduard Ludwig, Gustav Hasenflug, Hugo Häring, Sep Ruf or Jens Risom were shown.
 100 Jahre Deutscher Werkbund 1907|2007 100 ANOS DE ARQUITETURA E DESIGN NA ALEMANHA 1907–2007 17.05.2013 - 27.07.2013 Fábrica Santo Thyrso | Santo Tirso, Portugal

Awards 

 1952: Price of the city of Nuremberg
 1958: Officer of the Order of Leopold (Belgium)
 1973: Bavarian Order of Merit
 1976: Theodor Heuss-Medaille
 1976: Officer Cross of the Order of Merit of the Federal Republic of Germany
 1978: Bonifatius-Medaille des Bistums Fulda
 1980: Price of architecture of the city of Munich

References

Literature 

 Andreas Denk: Rufs Vermächtnis – Transformationen der Moderne, in: der architekt, 5/2008
 Helga Himen: Ruf, Sep. In: Neue Deutsche Biographie (NDB). Band 22. Duncker & Humblot, Berlin 2005, S. 231–233 (Digitalisat).
 Winfried Nerdinger in Zusammenarbeit mit Irene Meissner: Sep Ruf 1908–1982. Moderne mit Tradition. München 2008
 Sep Ruf 1908-1982: Leben und Werk Irene Meissner 2013
 Hans Wichmann: Sep Ruf. Bauten und Projekte. DVA, Stuttgart, 1986, 
 Der Bungalow, Paul Swiridoff, Wohn- und Empfangsgebäude für den Bundeskanzler in Bonn, Neske Verlag, Pfullingen 1967, Text von Erich Steingräber
 Der Kanzlerbungalow, Edition Axel Menges GmbH, 2009 - 47 Seiten 
 Andreas Schätzke/Joaquín Medina Warmburg: Sep Ruf. Kanzlerbungalow, Bonn, Edition Axel Menges, Stuttgart/London 2009,  Book in English language: Sep Ruf, Kanzlerbungalow, Bonn
 Judith Koppetsch: Palais Schaumburg. Von der Villa zum Kanzlersitz 2013 Haus der Geschichte Bonn
 Georg Adlbert: Der Kanzlerbungalow. Erhaltung, Instandsetzung, Neunutzung, Krämer, Stuttgart 2010 (2. erw. Aufl.), 
 Andreas Denk, Ingeborg Flagge: Architekturführer Bonn. Dietrich Reimer Verlag, Berlin 1997, S. 84.
 Georg Adlbert, Volker Busse, Hans Walter Hütter, Judith Koppetsch, Wolfgang Pehnt, Heinrich Welfing, Udo Wengst (Autoren), Stiftung Haus der Geschichte der Bundesrepublik Deutschland/Wüstenrot Stiftung Ludwigsburg (Hg.): Kanzlerbungalow, Prestel, München 2009, 
 Burkhard Körner: Der Kanzlerbungalow von Sep Ruf in Bonn. In: Bonner Geschichtsblätter. Band 49/50, Bonn 1999/2000 (2001), S. 507–613.
 Egon Eiermann/ Sep Ruf, Deutsche Pavilions: Brussel 1958 
The Architecture of Expo 58 by Rika Devos & Mil De Kooning (eds). Dexia/Mercatorfonds, 2006
 Helmut Vogt: Wächter der Bonner Republik. Die Alliierten Hohen Kommissare 1949–1955, Verlag Ferdindand Schöningh, Paderborn 2004, S. 99, 102, 103–118.
 Andreas Denk, Ingeborg Flagge: Architekturführer Bonn. Dietrich Reimer Verlag, Berlin 1997, S. 79.
 Herbert Strack, Spaziergang durch das 1100 Jahre alte Muffendorf, Bad Godesberg 1988
 Andrea M. Kluxen: Die Geschichte der Kunstakademie in Nürnberg 1662–1998, in: Jahrbuch für fränkische Landesforschung 59 (1999), 167–207.
 
 Franz Winzinger (Red.): 1662–1962, Dreihundert Jahre Akademie der bildenden Künste in Nürnberg. Nürnberg 1962
 Bernward Deneke, Rainer Kahsnitz (Hrsg.): Das Germanische Nationalmuseum. Nürnberg 1852–1977. Beiträge zu seiner Geschichte. München/Berlin 1978 (umfassender Sammelband zu allen Aspekten und Einrichtungen des Museums).
 Schatzkammer der Deutschen.  Aus den Sammlungen des Germanischen Nationalmuseums Nürnberg. Nürnberg 1982
 The Transparent State: Architecture And Politics In Postwar Germany by Deborah Ascher Barnstone
 Minimalism in Germany. The sixties - Minimalismus in Deutschland. Die 1960er Jahre" Neuerscheinung 2012 Daimler Contemporary Art Collection, Berlin Editor: Renate Wiehager für die Daimler AG, architecture: page 459-467, author: Susannah Cremer-Bermbach
 "Architektur der Wunderkinder: Aufbruch und Verdrängung in Bayern 1945 - 1960" hg. Winfried Nerdinger in Zusammenarbeit mit Inez Florschütz, Katalog zur Ausstellung in der Pinakothek der Moderne, München, Gebundene Ausgabe: 358 Seiten Verlag: Pustet, Salzburg;  2005
 "350 Jahre Akademie der Bildenden Künste Nürnberg" Herausgeber: Akademie der Bildenden Künste Nürnberg 2012 , Verschiedene Beiträge, u.a. von Irene Meissner : "Die Akademie der Bildenden Künste in Nürnberg - Ein Hauptwerk der deutschen Nachkriegsarchitektur von Sep Ruf"
 "Aufbruch! Architektur der Fünfzigerjahre in Deutschland", Prestel, 160 Seiten

External links 

 
 Official website of Sep Ruf
 
 Sep Ruf Architekten Portrait
 Chancellor's Bungalow shortmovie Goethe-Institut
 Academy of Fine Arts Nuremberg homepage
 200 Years Academy of Fine Arts Munich
 Academy Berlin West 
 House of Mr. Hellwig
 German pavilion in Brussels Architect: Jorn Utzon english and spanish text
 Carola Ebert: Into the great wide open: The West-German modernist bungalow of the 1960s as a psycho-political re-creation of home
 The New York Times Travel: Berlin's Hansaviertel at 50: A postwar future gains a new present by Jan Otakar Fischer Published: Monday, 24 September 2007
american estate Plittersdorf
 HICOG estate Muffendorf
 Germanisches Nationalmuseum Nuremberg
 Germanisches Nationalmuseum
 Theodor Heuss Bau
 Interbau 57 Hansaviertel Berlin
 The renovation of the Universitätsplatz in Fulda
 Zeit article: Too cool for this country, in German language
 The New York Times Books: Capital Dilemma Germany's Search for a New Architecture of Democracyby Michael Z. Wise Princeton Architectural Press
 Bauwelt: Poesie der Tranzparenz
 FAZ: Wir Deutschen bauten ganz anders
 Wüstenrot-Stiftung Kanzlerbungalow
 Generalanzeiger Bonn: Das Haus der Geschichte bringt ein sehr informatives Buch heraus.
 Bavarian State Library: Die Welt: One million books from Munich for Google german text
 Graham-Foundation, grantee Lynette Widder 2011 Sep Ruf and the image of post-war modernism the construction detail as index of changing paradigms in german modern architecture
 Rhode Island Institute of Design academic affairs, lynnette widder receives graham foundation research grant
 graham foundation press release:
 Lynnette Widder, Lecturer, Masters of Sustainability Management, The Earth Institute and The School of Continuing Education Columbia University 2012, Skidmore Owings Merrill’s Façade Construction for the American Consulates in Germany, 1953-58, and its Impact on German Post-war Modern Building

1908 births
1982 deaths
Academic staff of the Academy of Fine Arts, Nuremberg
20th-century German architects
Officers Crosses of the Order of Merit of the Federal Republic of Germany